Kévin Schur (born 19 November 1990) is a French professional footballer who played as a forward for Ligue 2 club Bastia.

Honours 
Avranches
 Championnat de France Amateur: 2013–14

Bastia
 Championnat National 3: 2017–18
 Championnat National 2: 2018–19
 Championnat National: 2020–21

References

External links 
 SC Bastia profile
 

1990 births
Living people
French footballers
Association football forwards
FC Versailles 78 players
US Alençon players
US Avranches players
Le Mans FC players
SC Bastia players
Division d'Honneur players
Championnat National 2 players
Championnat National players
Championnat National 3 players
Ligue 2 players